The 2009–10 English football season is Wigan Athletic's fifth consecutive season in the Premier League.

After Steve Bruce left the club to join Sunderland, the club approached Swansea City manager Roberto Martínez. The Spaniard signed a three-year deal with Wigan on 15 June, bringing four backroom staff with him.

The new manager's first signing was Jordi Gómez, who signed from RCD Espanyol. The club then confirmed three pre-season fixtures, all away, to Crewe Alexandra, Preston North End and Norwich City.

The departure of Ecuadorian winger Antonio Valencia was confirmed on 30 June, as the 23-year-old moved to Manchester United for a club-record fee rumoured to be around £16 million. The club then announced the signing of Hendry Thomas from Honduran side Olimpia on a three-year deal.

Trinidadian striker Jason Scotland became Martínez's third signing when he agreed a two-year deal on 15 July. Republic of Ireland under-21 international James McCarthy then agreed a five-year deal, joining from Scottish Premier League side Hamilton Academical.

Chelsea winger Scott Sinclair signed a one-year loan deal with the club, and Martínez also signed Spaniards Román Golobart and Abian Serrano. Rayo Vallecano centre-half Antonio Amaya was also snapped up on the eve of the new season on a three-year deal. Meanwhile, former manager Steve Bruce brought midfielder Lee Cattermole to Sunderland for £6 million.

There was further movement in the transfer market as Martínez signed defensive midfielder Mohamed Diamé after complications suffered with Diamé's medical. The club then confirmed the departure of midfielder Michael Brown to Portsmouth after two years and 64 appearances.

Squad

First team squad
(Source)

On loan

Transfers

In

Out

Released

Loans in

Loans out

Player statistics

Premier League

(Sources)

Match results

Pre-season

Premier League

League Cup

FA Cup

Final league table

References

External links
Official website

Wigan Athletic F.C. seasons
Wigan Athletic